The 8th Australian Academy of Cinema and Television Arts International Awards (commonly known as the AACTA International Awards) is presented by the Australian Academy of Cinema and Television Arts (AACTA), a non-profit organisation whose aim is to identify, award, promote and celebrate Australia's greatest achievements in film and television. Awards were handed out for the best films of 2018 regardless of the country of origin, and are the international counterpart to the awards for Australian films.

Nominees

References

External links
 The Official Australian Academy of Cinema and Television Arts website

AACTA International Awards
AACTA International Awards
AACTA Awards ceremonies
AACTA International
2019 in American cinema